The Research, Development and Evaluation Commission (RDEC) was a branch of the Executive Yuan of the Taiwan (ROC). The commission was responsible for policy research and development, policy planning, policy supervision and evaluation, government's IT management, circulation of government publications, archives and other tasks assigned by the prime minister.

The agency was dissolved on 21 January 2014 when it was merged with Council for Economic Planning and Development to form the National Development Council.

Organizational structure
 Department of Research and Development
 Department of Planning
 Department of Supervision and Evaluation
 Department of Information Management
 Department of Regional Affairs
 Secretariat
 Personnel Office
 Civil Service Ethics Office
 Accounting Office

List of Ministers

See also
 National Development Council (Taiwan)
 Joint Research Centre

References

1969 establishments in Taiwan
2014 disestablishments in Taiwan
Defunct organizations based in Taiwan
Executive Yuan